Ancient Estonia refers to a period covering History of Estonia from the middle of the 8th millennium BC until the conquest and subjugation of the local Finnic tribes in the first quarter of the 13th century during the Teutonic and Danish Northern Crusades.

The Mesolithic Period

The region has been populated since the end of the last glacial era, about 10,000 BC. The earliest traces of human settlement in Estonia are connected with Kunda culture. The oldest known settlement in Estonia is the Pulli settlement, which was located on the banks of the river Pärnu, near the town of Sindi, in southwestern Estonia. It has been dated to the beginning of the 9th millennium BC. The Kunda Culture received its name from the Lammasmäe settlement site in northern Estonia, which dates from earlier than 8500. Bone and stone artifacts similar to those found at Kunda have been discovered elsewhere in Estonia, as well as in Latvia, Russia, northern Lithuania and southern Finland. Among minerals, flint and quartz were used the most for making cutting tools.

The Neolithic Period
The beginning of the Neolithic period is marked by the ceramics of the Narva culture, which appears in Estonia at the beginning of the 5th millennium BC. The oldest finds date from around 4900 BC. The first pottery was made of thick clay mixed with pebbles, shells or plants. The Narva type ceramics are found throughout almost the entire Estonian coastal region and on the islands. The stone and bone tools of the era have a notable similarity with the artifacts of the Kunda culture.

Artifacts identified as belonging to the "Comb Ceramic Culture" have been found at sites from Northern Finland and Russia to Eastern Prussia. Burials associated with the culture often include figures of animals, birds, snakes and humans carved from bone and amber beginning from the middle of the 4th millennium BC. Until the early 1980s, the scholarly consensus held that the appearance of Comb Ceramic culture artifacts  was associated with the arrival of Baltic Finns (ancestors of the Estonians, Finns, and Livonians) on the shores of the Baltic Sea. However, such a linking of archaeologically defined cultural entities with ethno-linguistic ones is no longer assumed to be a given. An alternative hypothesis is that the increase of settlement finds in the period may have been associated with an economic boom related to the warming of climate. Some researchers have even argued that a Uralic language may have been spoken in Estonia and Finland since the end of the last glaciation.

Late Neolithic - Chalcolithic 

The beginning of the Late Neolithic Period about 2200 BC is characterized by the appearance of the Corded Ware culture, pottery with corded decoration and well-polished stone axes (s.c. boat-shape axes). Evidence of agriculture is provided by charred grain of wheat on the wall of a corded-ware vessel found in Iru settlement. Osteological analysis show an attempt was made to domesticate the wild boar.

Specific burial customs were characterized by the dead being laid on their sides with their knees pressed against their breast, one hand under the head. Objects placed into the graves were made of bones of domesticated animals.

The Bronze Age

 

The beginning of the Bronze Age in Estonia is dated to approximately 1800 BC. The development of the borders between the Baltic Finns and the Balts was under way. The first fortified settlements, Asva and Ridala on the island of Saaremaa and Iru in the Northern Estonia began to be built. The development of shipbuilding facilitated the spread of bronze. Changes took place in burial customs, a new type of burial ground spread from Germanic to Estonian areas, stone cist graves and cremation burials became increasingly common aside small number of boat-shaped stone graves.

The Iron Age
The Pre-Roman Iron Age began in Estonia about 500 BC and lasted until the middle of the 1st century BC. The oldest iron items were imported, although since the 1st century iron was smelted from local marsh and lake ore. Settlement sites were located mostly in places that offered natural protection. Fortresses were built, although used temporarily. The appearance of square Celtic fields surrounded by enclosures in Estonia date from the Pre-Roman Iron Age. The majority of stones with man-made indents, which presumably were connected with magic designed to increase crop fertility, date from this period. A new type of grave, quadrangular burial mounds began to develop. Burial traditions show the clear beginning of social stratification.

The Roman Iron Age in Estonia is roughly dated to between 50 and 450 AD, the era that was affected by the influence of the Roman Empire. In material culture this is reflected by few Roman coins, some jewellery and artefacts. The abundance of iron artifacts in Southern Estonia speaks of closer mainland ties with southern areas while the islands of western and northern Estonia communicated with their neighbors mainly by sea. By the end of the period three clearly defined tribal dialectical areas: Northern Estonia, Southern Estonia, and Western Estonia (including the islands) had emerged, the population of each having formed its own understanding of identity.

Early Middle Ages
The name of Estonia occurs first in a form of Aestii in the 1st century AD by Tacitus. However, at this stage it probably indicated Baltic tribes living in the area of Western Lithuania and the present-day Kaliningrad. In the Norse sagas (13th century) the term apparently was used to indicate the Estonians.

According to one interpretation, Ptolemy in his Geography III in the middle of the 2nd century AD mentions the Osilians among other dwellers on the Baltic shore.

The extent of Estonian territory in early medieval times is disputed but the nature of their religion is not. They were known to the Scandinavians as experts in wind-magic, as were the Lapps (known at the time as Finns) in the North. The name Estonia is first mentioned by Cassiodorus in his book V. Letters 1–2 dating from the 6th century.

Saxo Grammaticus describes the Curonians and Estonians as participating in the Battle of Bråvalla on the side of the Swedes against the Danes, who were aided by the Livonians and the Wends of Pomerania. It is notable that other Baltic tribes — i.e., the Letts and Lithuanians — are not mentioned by Saxo as participating in the fight.
Snorri Sturluson relates in his Ynglinga saga how the Swedish king Ingvar (7th century), the son of Östen and a great warrior, who was forced to patrol the shores of his kingdom fighting Estonian pirates. The saga speaks of his invasion of Estonia where he fell in a battle against the men of Estland who had come down with a great army. After the battle, King Ingvar was buried close to the seashore in Estonia and the Swedes returned home.

According to Heimskringla sagas, in the year 967 the Norwegian Queen Astrid escaped with her son, in future king of Norway Olaf Tryggvason from her homeland to Novgorod, where her brother Sigurd held an honoured position at the court of Prince Vladimir. On their journey, "Eistland" (Oeselian?) Vikings  raided the ship, killing some of the crew and taking others into slavery. Six years later, when Sigurd Eirikson traveled to "Eistland" to collect taxes on behalf of "Valdemar" (Vladimir), he spotted Olaf in a market in an unmentioned city and paid for his freedom.

A battle between Oeselian and Icelandic Vikings off Saaremaa is described in Njál's saga as occurring in 972 AD.

About 1008, Olaf the Holy, later king of Norway, landed on Saaremaa. The Oesilians, taken by surprise, had at first agreed to pay the demands made by Olaf, but then gathered an army during the negotiations and attacked the Norwegians. Olaf (who would have been only 13 years old) claimed to have won the battle. Olaf was the subject of several biographies, both hagiographies and sagas, in the Middle Ages, and many of the historical facts concerning his adventures are disputed.

The Chudes as mentioned in Old East Slavic chronicles are in early context usually considered as Baltic Finns in north-western Rus or even as all non-Slavic people in north-eastern Europe, but since 11th century mainly as Estonians. According to Primary Chronicle the Chudes where one of the founders of the Rus' state in 9th century. According to Nestor Yaroslav I the Wise invaded the country of the Chuds in 1030 and laid the foundations of Yuriev, (the historical Russian name of Tartu, Estonia).

According to the Novgorod Chronicle, Varyag Ulf (Uleb) from Novgorod was crushed in battle at Iron Gate, which is usually located in northern Russia, but according to one hypothesis took place on sea close to the Tallinn Bay in 1032.

In the 1st centuries AD political and administrative subdivisions began to emerge in Estonia. Two larger subdivisions appeared: the parish (kihelkond) and the county (maakond). The parish consisted of several villages. Nearly all parishes had at least one fortress. The defense of the local area was directed by the highest official, the parish elder. The county was composed of several parishes, also headed by an elder. By the 13th century the following major counties had developed in Estonia: Saaremaa (Osilia), Läänemaa (Rotalia or Maritima), Harjumaa (Harria), Rävala (Revalia), Virumaa (Vironia), Järvamaa (Jervia), Sakala (Saccala), and Ugandi (Ugaunia).

Estonia constitutes one of the richest territories in the Baltic for hoards from the 11th and the 12th centuries. The earliest coin hoards found in Estonia are Arabic Dirhams from the 8th century. The largest Viking Age hoards found in Estonia have been at Maidla and Kose. Out of the 1500 coins published in catalogues, 1000 are Anglo-Saxon.

Varbola Stronghold was one of the largest circular rampart fortress and trading center built in Estonia, Harju County at the time.

In the 11th century the Scandinavians are frequently chronicled as combating the Vikings from the eastern shores of the Baltic Sea. 
With the rise of Christianity, centralized authority in Scandinavia and Germany eventually lead to Baltic crusades.
The east Baltic world was transformed by military conquest: First the Livs, Letts and Estonians, then the Prussians and the Finns underwent defeat, baptism, military occupation and sometimes extermination by groups of Germans, Danes and Swedes.

Sources
History of Estonia 2nd Edition. Tõnu Tannberg, Ain Mäesalu, Tõnis Lukas, Mati Laur and Ago Pajur, A/S BIT, Tallinn, 2002;

References

History of Estonia by period
Prehistoric Europe
Historical regions in Estonia